Phyllonorycter yakusimensis is a moth of the family Gracillariidae. It is known from the island of Kyūshū in Japan.

The wingspan is 9-9.5 mm.

The larvae feed on Rhododendron tashiroi. They mine the leaves of their host plant.

References

yakusimensis
Moths of Japan
Moths described in 1967